An auk or alcid is a bird of the family Alcidae in the order Charadriiformes. The alcid family includes the murres, guillemots, auklets, puffins, and murrelets.  The family contains 25 extant or recently extinct species that are divided into 11 genera.

Apart from the extinct great auk, all auks can fly, and are excellent swimmers (appearing to "fly") and divers, but their walking appears clumsy.

Names 
Several species have different English names in Europe and North America. The two species known as "murres" in North America are called "guillemots" in Europe, and the species called little auk in Europe is referred to as dovekie in North America.

Etymology 
The word "auk"  is derived from Icelandic álka and Norwegian alka or alke from Old Norse ālka from Proto-Germanic *alkǭ (sea-bird, auk).

Taxonomy 
The family name Alcidae comes from the genus Alca given by Carl Linnaeus in 1758 for the razorbill (Alca torda) from the Norwegian word alke.

Description 
Auks are superficially similar to penguins, having black-and-white colours, upright posture, and some of their habits. Nevertheless, they are not closely related to penguins, but rather are believed to be an example of moderate convergent evolution. Auks are monomorphic (males and females are similar in appearance).

Due to their short wings, auks have to flap their wings very quickly to fly.

Although not to the extent of penguins, auks have largely sacrificed flight, and also mobility on land, in exchange for swimming ability; their wings are a compromise between the best possible design for diving and the bare minimum needed for flying. This varies by subfamily, with the Uria guillemots (including the razorbill) and  murrelets being the most efficient under the water, whereas the puffins and auklets are better adapted for flying and walking.

Feeding and ecology
The feeding behaviour of auks is often compared to that of penguins;  both groups are wing-propelled, pursuit divers. In the region where auks live, their only seabird competition are cormorants (which are dive-powered by their strong feet). In areas where the two groups feed on the same prey, the auks tend to feed further offshore. Strong-swimming murres hunt faster, schooling fish, whereas auklets take slower-moving krill.

Breeding and colonies
Auks are pelagic birds, spending the majority of their adult lives on the open sea and going ashore only for breeding, although some species, such as the common guillemot, spend a great part of the year defending their nesting spot from others.

Auks are monogamous, and tend to form lifelong pairs. They typically lay a single egg, and they use the nesting site year after year.

Some species, such as the Uria guillemots (murres), nest in large colonies on cliff edges; others, such as  the Cepphus guillemots, breed in small groups on rocky coasts; and the puffins, auklets, and some murrelets nest in burrows. All species except the Brachyramphus murrelets are colonial.

Evolution and distribution

 
Traditionally, the auks were believed to be one of the earliest distinct charadriiform lineages due to their characteristic morphology, but genetic analyses have demonstrated that these peculiarities are the product of strong natural selection, instead; as opposed to, for example, plovers (a much older charadriiform lineage), auks radically changed from a wading shorebird to a diving seabird lifestyle. Thus today, the auks are no longer separated in their own suborder (Alcae), but are considered part of the Lari suborder, which otherwise contains gulls and similar birds. Judging from genetic data, their closest living relatives appear to be the skuas, with these two lineages separating about 30 million years ago (Mya). Alternatively, auks may have split off far earlier from the rest of the Lari and undergone strong morphological, but slow genetic evolution, which would require a very high evolutionary pressure, coupled with a long lifespan and slow reproduction.

The earliest unequivocal fossils of auks are from the late Eocene, some 35 Mya. The genus Miocepphus, (from the Miocene, 15 Mya) is the earliest known from good specimens. Two very fragmentary fossils are often assigned to the Alcidae, although this may not be correct: Hydrotherikornis (Late Eocene) and Petralca (Late Oligocene). Most extant genera are known to exist since the Late Miocene or Early Pliocene (about 5 Mya). Miocene fossils have been found in both California and Maryland, but the greater diversity of fossils and tribes in the Pacific leads most scientists to conclude they first evolved there, and in the Miocene Pacific, the first fossils of extant genera are found. Early movement between the Pacific and the Atlantic probably happened to the south (since no northern opening to the Atlantic existed), with later movements across the Arctic Ocean. The flightless subfamily Mancallinae, which was apparently restricted to the Pacific Coast of southern North America and became extinct in the Early Pleistocene, is sometimes included in the family Alcidae under some definitions. One species, Miomancalla howardae, is the largest charadriiform of all time.

The family contains 25 extant or recently extinct species that are divided into 11 genera. The extant auks (subfamily Alcinae) are broken up into two main groups - the usually high-billed puffins (tribe Fraterculini) and auklets (tribe Aethiini), as opposed to the more slender-billed murres and true auks (tribe Alcini), and the murrelets and guillemots (tribes Brachyramphini and Cepphini). The tribal arrangement was originally based on analyses of morphology and ecology. mtDNA cytochrome b sequences,  and allozyme studies confirm these findings except that the Synthliboramphus murrelets should be split into a distinct tribe, as they appear more closely related to the Alcini; in any case, assumption of a closer relationship between the former and the true guillemots was only weakly supported by earlier studies.

Of the genera, only a few species are placed in each. This is probably a product of the rather small geographic range of the family (the most limited of any seabird family), and the periods of glacial advance and retreat that have kept the populations on the move in a narrow band of subarctic ocean.

Today, as in the past, the auks are restricted to cooler northern waters. Their ability to spread further south is restricted as their prey hunting method, pursuit diving, becomes less efficient in warmer waters. The southernmost auks, in California and Mexico, can survive there because of cold upwellings. The current paucity of auks in the Atlantic (six species), compared to the Pacific (19–20 species) is considered to be because of extinctions to the Atlantic auks; the fossil record shows many more species were in the Atlantic during the Pliocene. Auks also tend to be restricted to continental-shelf waters and breed on few oceanic islands.

Hydotherikornis oregonus (Described by Miller in 1931), the oldest purported alcid from the Eocene of California, is actually a petrel (as reviewed by Chandler in 1990) and is reassigned to the tubenoses (Procellariiformes). A 2003 paper, "The Earliest North American Record of Auk (Aves: Alcidae) From the Late Eocene of Central Georgia",  reports a Late Eocene, wing-propelled, diving auk from the Priabonain stage of the Late Eocene. These sediments have been dated through Chandronian NALMA {North American Land Mammal Age}, at an estimate of 34.5 to 35.5 million years on the Eocene time scale for fossil-bearing sediments of the Clinchfield Formation, Gordon, Wilkinson County, Georgia. Furthermore, the sediments containing this unabraded portion of a left humerus (43.7 mm long) are tropical or subtropical as evidenced by a wealth of warm-water shark teeth, palaeophied snake vertebrae, and turtles.

Systematics

 Basal and incertae sedis
 Miocepphus (fossil: Middle Miocene of CE USA)
 Miocepphus mcclungi Wetmore, 1940
 Miocepphus bohaskai Wijnker and Olson, 2009
 Miocepphus blowi Wijnker and Olson, 2009
 Miocepphus mergulellus Wijnker and Olson, 2009
 Subfamily Alcinae
 Tribe Alcini – typical auks and murres
 Uria
 Common murre or common guillemot, Uria aalge
 Thick-billed murre or, Brünnich's guillemot, Uria lomvia
 Alle
 Little auk or dovekie, Alle alle
 Pinguinus
 Great auk, Pinguinus impennis (extinct, c.1844)
 Alca
 Razorbill, Alca torda
 Tribe Synthliboramphini – synthliboramphine murrelets
 Synthliboramphus
 Scripps's murrelet, Synthliboramphus scrippsi – formerly in S. hypoleucus ("Xantus's murrelet")
 Guadalupe murrelet, Synthliboramphus hypoleucus – sometimes separated in Endomychura
 Craveri's murrelet, Synthliboramphus craveri – sometimes separated in Endomychura
 Ancient murrelet, Synthliboramphus antiquus
 Japanese murrelet, Synthliboramphus wumizusume
 Tribe Cepphini – true guillemots
 Cepphus
 Black guillemot or tystie,  Cepphus grylle
 Pigeon guillemot,  Cepphus columba
 Kurile guillemot, Cepphus columba snowi
 Spectacled guillemot,  Cepphus carbo
 Tribe Brachyramphini – brachyramphine murrelets
 Brachyramphus
 Marbled murrelet,  Brachyramphus marmoratus
 Long-billed murrelet, Brachyramphus perdix
 Kittlitz's murrelet,  Brachyramphus brevirostris
 Subfamily Fraterculinae
 Tribe Aethiini – auklets
 Ptychoramphus
 Cassin's auklet,  Ptychoramphus aleuticus
 Aethia
 Parakeet auklet,  Aethia psittacula
 Crested auklet,  Aethia cristatella
 Whiskered auklet,  Aethia pygmaea
 Least auklet,  Aethia pusilla
 Tribe Fraterculini – puffins
 Cerorhinca
 Rhinoceros auklet,  Cerorhinca monocerata
 Fratercula
 Atlantic puffin,  Fratercula arctica
 Horned puffin,  Fratercula corniculata
 Tufted puffin,  Fratercula cirrhata

Biodiversity of auks seems to have been markedly higher during the Pliocene. See the genus accounts for prehistoric species.

See also
 Kiviak, a traditional Inuit food from Greenland that is made of auks preserved in seal skin
 Tradeoffs for locomotion in air and water

References

Further reading
 
 
 
 Diving Birds of North America by Paul Johnsgard

External links 
 

 
 
Diving animals
Extant Eocene first appearances
Priabonian first appearances
Taxa named by William Elford Leach